Tiba Outlet Mall is  the first outlet mall built in Egypt as part of Nasr City in Cairo.  It was opened in 2011. The  mall contains more than 34 retail outlets, an amusement park, dining and entertainment, a cinema along with an underground parking garage capable of holding 107 vehicles, and a Carrefour supermarket.

Shopping malls in Egypt